Vassfjell Chapel is a chapel in Trondheim municipality in Trøndelag county, Norway. It is an annex chapel for the Klæbu parish which is part of the Heimdal og Byåsen prosti (deanery) in the Diocese of Nidaros. The white, wooden church was built in a long church style in 1974 by the architect students Steinar Romedal, Jan Oddvar Hareide, I. Tolo, and O. Holen.

History
At a meeting of the Trondheim Christian Student Association (TKS) in February 1969, a decision was made to build a sports chapel in rural Klæbu that could be the weekend centre for students from the region. The architecture students Steinar Romedal, Jan Oddvar Hareide, I. Tolo, and O. Holen began the work of drawing the designs for the chapel, and they were able to present the drawings to the association in the spring of 1971. On 16 September 1973, the first construction phase was completed. This phase included the chapel, kitchen, and bathroom. The church was formally consecrated by the Bishop Tord Godal on 4 March 1974. Construction phase two was to build an annex building and this was constructed from 1975 to 1977. It was architect Steinar Romedal who designed this building. In 1977, the third construction phase began where they built some leadership offices and prayer rooms on the site. The last project to be completed was a free-standing bell tower that was built in 1980.

See also
List of churches in Nidaros

References

Churches in Trondheim
Churches in Trøndelag
Long churches in Norway
Wooden churches in Norway
20th-century Church of Norway church buildings
Churches completed in 1974
1974 establishments in Norway